In mathematics, the nth taxicab number, typically denoted Ta(n) or Taxicab(n), also called the nth Ramanujan–Hardy number, is defined as the smallest integer that can be expressed as a sum of two positive integer cubes in n distinct ways. The most famous taxicab number is 1729 = Ta(2) = 13 + 123 = 93 + 103.

The name is derived from a conversation in about 1919 involving mathematicians G. H. Hardy and Srinivasa Ramanujan. As told by Hardy:

History and definition
The concept was first mentioned in 1657 by Bernard Frénicle de Bessy, who published the Hardy–Ramanujan number Ta(2) = 1729. This particular example of 1729 was made famous in the early 20th century by a story involving Srinivasa Ramanujan. In 1938, G. H. Hardy and E. M. Wright proved that such numbers exist for all positive integers n, and their proof is easily converted into a program to generate such numbers. However, the proof makes no claims at all about whether the thus-generated numbers are the smallest possible and so it cannot be used to find the actual value of Ta(n).

The taxicab numbers subsequent to 1729 were found with the help of computers. John Leech obtained Ta(3) in 1957. E. Rosenstiel, J. A. Dardis and C. R. Rosenstiel found Ta(4) in 1989. J. A. Dardis found Ta(5) in 1994 and it was confirmed by David W. Wilson in 1999. Ta(6) was announced by Uwe Hollerbach on the NMBRTHRY mailing list on March 9, 2008, following a 2003 paper by Calude et al. that gave a 99% probability that the number was actually Ta(6). Upper bounds for Ta(7) to Ta(12) were found by Christian Boyer in 2006.

The restriction of the summands to positive numbers is necessary, because allowing negative numbers allows for more (and smaller) instances of numbers that can be expressed as sums of cubes in n distinct ways.  The concept of a cabtaxi number has been introduced to allow for alternative, less restrictive definitions of this nature.  In a sense, the specification of two summands and powers of three is also restrictive; a generalized taxicab number allows for these values to be other than two and three, respectively.

Known taxicab numbers
So far, the following 6 taxicab numbers are known:

Upper bounds for taxicab numbers
For the following taxicab numbers upper bounds are known:

Cubefree taxicab numbers
A more restrictive taxicab problem requires that the taxicab number be cubefree, which means that it is not divisible by any cube other than 13. When a cubefree taxicab number T is written as T = x3 + y3, the numbers x and y must be relatively prime. Among the taxicab numbers Ta(n) listed above, only Ta(1) and Ta(2) are cubefree taxicab numbers. The smallest cubefree taxicab number with three representations was discovered by Paul Vojta (unpublished) in 1981 while he was a graduate student. It is

15170835645
= 5173 + 24683
= 7093 + 24563
= 17333 + 21523.

The smallest cubefree taxicab number with four representations was discovered by Stuart Gascoigne and independently by Duncan Moore in 2003. It is

1801049058342701083
= 922273 + 12165003
= 1366353 + 12161023
= 3419953 + 12076023
= 6002593 + 11658843
.

See also

 1729 (number)
 Diophantine equation
 Euler's sum of powers conjecture
 Generalized taxicab number
 Beal's conjecture
 Jacobi–Madden equation
 Prouhet–Tarry–Escott problem
 Pythagorean quadruple
 Sums of three cubes
 Sums of powers, a list of related conjectures and theorems

Notes

References
 G. H. Hardy and E. M. Wright, An Introduction to the Theory of Numbers, 3rd ed., Oxford University Press, London & NY, 1954, Thm. 412.
 J. Leech, Some Solutions of Diophantine Equations, Proc. Camb. Phil. Soc. 53, 778–780, 1957.
 E. Rosenstiel, J. A. Dardis and C. R. Rosenstiel, The four least solutions in distinct positive integers of the Diophantine equations = x3 + y3 = z3 + w3 = u3 + v3 = m3 + n3,  Bull. Inst. Math.
 David W. Wilson, The Fifth Taxicab Number is 48988659276962496, Journal of Integer Sequences, Vol. 2 (1999), online. (Wilson was unaware of J. A. Dardis' prior discovery of Ta(5) in 1994 when he wrote this.)
 C. S. Calude, E. Calude and M. J. Dinneen: What is the value of Taxicab(6)?, Journal of Universal Computer Science, Vol. 9 (2003), p. 1196–1203

External links
 A 2002 post to the Number Theory mailing list by Randall L. Rathbun
 
 Taxicab and other maths at Euler
 

Number theory
Srinivasa Ramanujan